Urwa is a residential locality in the city of Mangalore, in the state of Karnataka in India.

Urwa is famous for the Mariyamma Temple, which is popularly known as Urwa Marigudi, and also several renowned educational institutions.

Religious Places
 Shri Mariyamma Temple :which has a got a history of 700 years, popularly known has urwa marigudi, where lakhs of people visit during annual festival
 Immaculate Conception Church, consecrated in 1865, celebrated 150 years on 1 May 2015

Educational institutions
 St Aloysius Higher Primary School, Urwa
 Canara High School, Urwa
 Karavali College of Nursing
 SCS College of Nursing
 Ladyhill English Higher Primary School
 Vikas College of Physiotherapy

References

Localities in Mangalore